Xie Wanying (October 5, 1900 – February 28, 1999), better known by her pen name Bing Xin or Xie Bingxin, was one of the most prolific Chinese women writers of the 20th century. Many of her works were written for young readers. She was the chairperson of the China Federation of Literary and Art Circles. Her pen name Bing Xin (literally "Ice Heart") carries the meaning of a morally pure heart, and is taken from a line in a Tang dynasty poem by Wang Changling.

Bing Xin published her first prose in the Morning Post (Chinese: 晨報) The Impressions of the 21st Hearing and her first novel Two Families in August 1919. Before and after studying abroad in 1923, she began to publish prose letters Jixiaoduzhe (To Young Readers; Chinese: 寄小讀者), which became a foundation stone of Chinese children's literature. Bing Xin was hired by the University of Tokyo as the first foreign female lecturer to teach a Chinese New Literature course. She returned to China in 1951.

Life 
Bing Xin was born in Fuzhou, Fujian, moved to Shanghai with her family when she was seven months old, and moved again to the coastal port city of Yantai, Shandong when she was four. These moves had a crucial influence on Bing Xin's personality and philosophy of love and beauty, as the vastness and beauty of the sea greatly expanded and refined young Bing Xin's mind and heart. It was also in Yantai that Bing Xin first began to read the classics of Chinese literature, such as Romance of the Three Kingdoms and Water Margin, when she was just seven.

Bing Xin entered Fuzhou Women's Normal School and started preparatory study in 1911. In 1913, Bing Xin moved to Beijing. She entered the science department of North China Union Women's University (華北協和女子大學) and began to learn to become a doctor. Influences by the May Fourth Movement and the New Culture Movement, Bing Xin transferred to the Department of Literature. The May Fourth Movement in 1919 inspired and elevated Bing Xin's patriotism to new high levels, starting her writing career as she wrote for a school newspaper at Yanjing University where she was enrolled as a student and published her first novel. While at Yanjing in 1921, Bing Xin was baptized a Christian, but was throughout her life generally indifferent to Christian rituals.

Bing Xin graduated from Yanjing University in 1923 with a bachelor's degree, and went to the United States to study at Wellesley College, earning a master's degree at Wellesley in literature in 1926. Before and after studying abroad, she wrote prose about her journeys while traveling in foreign countries and sent them back to China for publication. The collection was To Young Readers, which was an early work of Chinese children's literature. She then returned to Yanjing University to teach until 1936.

In 1929, she married Wu Wenzao, an anthropologist and her good friend when they were studying in the United States. Together, Bing Xin and her husband visited different intellectual circles around the world, communicating with other intellectuals such as Virginia Woolf.

In 1940, Bing Xin was elected a member of the National Senate.

During the war of resistance against Japan, she wrote guanyu nüren (About Women) under the pen name Nan Shi (Mr. Man) in Chongqing, and actively engaged in creation and cultural salvation activities in Kunming, Chongqing and other places.

After war period, Bing Xin worked at the Department of New Chinese Literature at the University of Tokyo, and taught the history of Chinese new literature from 1949 to 1951, and published some short articles in local newspapers.

Later in her life, Bing Xin taught in Japan for a short period and stimulated more cultural communications between China and the other parts of the world as a traveling Chinese writer. In literature, Bing Xin founded the "Bing Xin Style" as a new literary style. She contributed a lot to children's literature in China (her writings were incorporated into children's textbooks), and also undertook various translation tasks, including translating the works of Indian literary figure Rabindranath Tagore.

Because of the translation of Kahlil Gibran's The Prophet, Sand and Foam, Rabindranath Tagore's Gitanjali, The Gardener and other works, she was awarded the National Order of the Cedar by the president of the Republic of Lebanon in 1995. Tagore's prose poems inspired Bing Xin. She wrote the influential prose letters To the Little Readers, which was the best example. Affected by Tagore's pantheism, Bing Xin's creation moves towards the chant of tender love. With Tagore's influence, Bing Xin also created Fanxing and Chunshui. Bing Xin said, when she wrote Fanxing (A Maze of Stars)繁星 and Chunshui (Spring Water)春水, she was not writing poems. She was just influenced by Tagore's Stray Birds and wrote these "fragmented thoughts" in a few words in her notebook then collected into a collection.

Bing Xin's literary career was prolific and productive. She wrote a wide range of works—prose, poetry, novels, reflections, etc. Her career spanned more than seven decades in length, from 1919 to the 1990s.

During the Cultural Revolution (1966–1976), Bing Xin and her family were denounced. She and her husband, both over seventy years old, were sent to the remote countryside, although they were permitted to return to the city a year later.

After the Cultural Revolution, Bing Xin ushered in the second creative climax in her life. In June 1980, Bing Xin suffered from cerebral thrombosis, but she still insisted on writing. The short story Kongchao (Empty Nest)空巢 was published during this period and won the National Excellent Short Story Award.

In September 1994, Bing Xin was admitted to Beijing Hospital due to heart failure. From February 13, 1999, her condition deteriorated and she died on February 28, 1999, in Beijing Hospital at the age of 98. Shortly before her death, Zhu Rongji, Li Ruihuan, Hu Jintao and other central leaders, as well as leaders and writers' representatives of the China Writers Association visited her in person in the hospital.

Legacy
There is a Bing Xin Literature Museum in Changle in Fujian Province.
The Bing Xin Children's Literature Award is named in her honour. Her daughter Wu Qing continues to be involved with the award.

Selected works
Liangge Jiating (两个家庭, Two Families) (1919) 
Jimo (寂寞, Loneliness) (1922)
Xianqing (閒情, Leisure) (1922)
Chaoren (超人, Superhuman) (1923)
Fanxing (繁星, A Myriad of Stars) (1923)
Chunshui (春水, Spring Water) (1923)
Liu yi jie (六一姐, Six-one sister) (1924)
Ji xiao duzhe (寄小讀者, To Young Readers) (1926)
Nangui (南歸, Homeward South) (1931)
Wangshi (往事, The Past) (1931)
Bing Xin Quanji (冰心全集, The Collected Works of Bing Xin) (1932–1933)
Yinghua zan (櫻花讚, Ode to Sakura)
Wo men zheli meiyou dongtian (我們這裡沒有冬天, No Winter in My Hometown) (1974)
Wo de guxiang (我的故鄉, My Home) (1983)
Guanyu nuren (關於女人, About Females) (1999)

Works available in English
The Photograph. Beijing: Chinese Literature Press (1992)
Spring Waters. Peking, (1929)
The Little Orange Lamp (小橘灯, 1957), translated by Gong Shifen, Renditions, Autumn 1989, pp. 130–132.

References

Further reading
 Chen, Mao. "In and Out of Home: Bing Xin Recontextualized" (Chapter 5). In: Williams, Philip F. (editor). Asian Literary Voices: From Marginal to Mainstream (Archive). Amsterdam University Press, 2010. . p. 63-70. Available at the OAPEN Library.

Portrait 
  Bing Xin. A Portrait by Kong Kai Ming at Hong Kong Baptist University Library

External links

Bing Xin at China Culture.org
Bing Xin at Renditions.org 
冰心网 (Bing Xin Net)

1900 births
1999 deaths
Victims of the Cultural Revolution
Chinese Christians
Chinese women poets
Pseudonymous women writers
People's Republic of China poets
Writers from Fuzhou
Wellesley College alumni
Boxer Indemnity Scholarship recipients
Yenching University alumni
Republic of China poets
20th-century Chinese women writers
Chinese women short story writers
20th-century Chinese short story writers
Poets from Fujian
20th-century novelists
Chinese women novelists
People's Republic of China novelists
Republic of China short story writers
People's Republic of China short story writers
Short story writers from Fujian
20th-century pseudonymous writers